Ñawinqucha (Quechua ñawi eye; button hole, -n a suffix, qucha lake, hispanicized spellings Ñahuincocha, Ñahuin ccocha) is a lake in Peru located in the Huancavelica Region, Huancavelica Province, Acobambilla District. It lies west of Warmiqucha and south of Milluqucha.

References 

Lakes of Peru
Lakes of Huancavelica Region